Umana may refer to:

 Numana (in Curiate Latin), an Italian city, former bishopric and present Latin Catholic titular see
 Mario Umana (1914-2005), American judge and politician
 Rafael Alfonso  Mendez, the Colombian artist known to most as Umaña, who created art for seven decades in New York, France, Spain, Florida, and Virginia
 Antonio Gutierrez de Umana and Francisco Leyba de Bonilla, Spanish explorers of the Great Plains in the 16th century
 Umana Yana, a thatched hut conference building in Georgetown, Guyana